Anne Gabriel (born 14 August 1963) is a Belgian former professional tennis player.

Gabriel was active on the professional tour in the 1980s. She was a member of the Belgium Federation Cup team from 1981 to 1984, amassing wins in six singles and one doubles rubber. Qualifying for her only French Open main draw in 1982, she came up against Cláudia Monteiro in the first round and lost in three sets.

References

External links
 
 
 

1963 births
Living people
Belgian female tennis players
20th-century Belgian women